Dev Agarwal  is an Indian cinematographer  and director. He is best known for his work in the films like CityLights  and Bollywood Diaries. Dev directed the documentary film Moved by Love which was screened at Cannes court metrege in 2015. He was nominated for his work in the International feature film Invasion 1897 at BON awards for best cinematography. Dev shot advertising campaign for Manforce Condoms  "Shut The Phone Up 3"  which won two golds in the ‘Best use of Social media for CSR’ and ‘Best use of video for CSR’ categories at Foxglove advertising awards.

Early life 
Dev Agarwal was born in Kolkata, West Bengal. He spent much of his growing up years in learning photography and watching films.

In Kolkata, Agarwal studied mass communication and film studies from St. Xavier's College, Kolkata and then did his post-graduation in cinematography from Film and Television Institute of India.

Career
Agarwal, an active member of the Western India Cinematographers Association and an accomplished Director of Photography in India, graduated from the Film and Television Institute of India and had shot feature films, documentaries and numerous advertising, corporate and short films. Shortly after passing out of Film & Television Institute of India, Agarwal found work as a cinematographer, working on travel documentaries which took him to different countries in south east Asia and various locations abroad. These projects captured the culture and vibrancy of these amazing cities. Agarwal's personal documentaries like Unheard Voices and notes to myself captured the plight of the Tibetan refugee. This film was screened at various film festivals.

Agarwal continued his cinematographic and directorial work in documentaries which are reflections of our society. Dev's documentary Moved by love was on the plight of helpless donkeys was screened at Cannes court metrage.

As a cinematographer, Agarwal shot the epic Nigerian historical Drama Invasion 1897.

In 2012, Agarwal started Purple Haze Films  to ensure a creative environment for all kind of films and to  provide full production and creative support to directors and production houses.

Filmography
 Jutti, the shoe (Short/2018) (Cinematographer)
 The Bed  (Short/2017) (Cinematographer)
 Bollywood Diaries (2016) (Cinematographer)
 Moved by Love (Documentary/2016)(Cinematographer/Director)
 Everest: The Other Side of Belief (Documentary/2015)(Cinematographer/Director)
 Invasion 1897 (2014) (Cinematographer)
 Light from Many Lamps: Beyond the Last Rainbow  (Documentary/2014) (Cinematographer/Director)
 CityLights (2014 film) (Cinematographer)
 Lehenga  (Short/2012) (Cinematographer)
 Unheard Voices and Notes to Myself (Documentary/2012) (Cinematographer/Director)
 We the Oppressed (Short/2010) (Cinematographer)
 Experimental Music Video (Short/2009) (Cinematographer)

References

External links

Official website

1984 births
Living people
Indian cinematographers
Film and Television Institute of India alumni
St. Xavier's College, Kolkata alumni
Indian documentary film directors